The 1872 United States presidential election in Delaware took place on November 5, 1872, as part of the 1872 United States presidential election. Voters chose three representatives, or electors to the Electoral College, who voted for president and vice president.

Delaware voted for the Republican candidate, Ulysses S. Grant, over Liberal Republican candidate Horace Greeley. Grant won Delaware by a narrow margin of 4.24%. Delaware would not vote Republican again until William McKinley won it in 1896.

Results

See also
 United States presidential elections in Delaware

References

Delaware
1872
1872 Delaware elections